The Theewaterskloof Local Municipality council consists of twenty-seven members elected by mixed-member proportional representation. Fourteen councillors are elected by first-past-the-post voting in fourteen wards, while the remaining thirteen are chosen from party lists so that the total number of party representatives is proportional to the number of votes received. In the election of 1 November 2021, no party won a majority.

Results 
The following table shows the composition of the council after past elections.

December 2000 election

The following table shows the results of the 2000 election.

By-elections from December 2000 to October 2002
The following by-elections were held to fill vacant ward seats in the period between the election in December 2000 and the floor crossing period in October 2002.

October 2002 floor crossing

In terms of the Eighth Amendment of the Constitution and the judgment of the Constitutional Court in United Democratic Movement v President of the Republic of South Africa and Others, in the period from 8–22 October 2002 councillors had the opportunity to cross the floor to a different political party without losing their seats. In the Theewaterskloof council, four councillors from the Democratic Alliance (DA) crossed to the New National Party (NNP), which had formerly been part of the DA.

By-elections from October 2002 to August 2004
The following by-elections were held to fill vacant ward seats in the period between the floor crossing periods in October 2002 and September 2004.

September 2004 floor crossing
Another floor-crossing period occurred on 1–15 September 2004, in which three of the NNP councillors crossed to the ANC.

March 2006 election

The following table shows the results of the 2006 election.

By-elections from March 2006 to August 2007
The following by-elections were held to fill vacant ward seats in the period between the election in March 2006 and the floor crossing period in September 2007.

September 2007 floor crossing
The final floor-crossing period occurred on 1–15 September 2007; floor-crossing was subsequently abolished in 2008 by the Fifteenth Amendment of the Constitution. In the Theewaterskloof council the single councillor representing the United Democratic Movement crossed to the Democratic Alliance.

By-elections from September 2007 to May 2011
The following by-elections were held to fill vacant ward seats in the period between the floor crossing period in September 2007 and the election in May 2011.

May 2011 election

The following table shows the results of the 2011 election.

By-elections from May 2011 to August 2016
The following by-elections were held to fill vacant ward seats in the period between the elections in May 2011 and August 2016.

August 2016 election

The following table shows the results of the 2016 election.

The local council sends five representatives to the council of the Overberg District Municipality: three from the Democratic Alliance and two from the African National Congress.

November 2021 election

The following table shows the results of the 2021 election.

The African National Congress and the Patriotic Alliance (PA), supported by Good, formed a minority coalition, with the PA's Kallie Papier elected as mayor, Good's John Michels as deputy and the ANC's Derick Appel as speaker.

References

Theewaterskloof
Elections in the Western Cape
Overberg District Municipality